Kenny Thomson (born 27 March 1969) is a New Zealand curler.

At the national level, he is a 2016 New Zealand men's champion curler and a 2010 New Zealand mixed champion.

Teams

Men's

Mixed

Mixed doubles

References

External links

Kenny Thomson on the New Zealand Curling Association database

Living people
1969 births
New Zealand male curlers
New Zealand curling champions
21st-century New Zealand people